Benjamin Harrison IV (1693 – July 12, 1745) was an American Virginia planter, politician, and Member of the Virginia House of Burgesses. He was the son of Benjamin Harrison III and the father of Benjamin Harrison V, who was a signer of the Declaration of Independence and the fifth governor of Virginia. Harrison built the homestead of Berkeley Plantation, which is believed to be the oldest three-story brick mansion in Virginia and is the ancestral home to two presidents: his grandson William Henry Harrison, and his great-great-grandson Benjamin Harrison. The Harrison family and the Carter family were both powerful families in Virginia, and they were united when Harrison married Anne Carter, the daughter of Robert "King" Carter. His family also forged ties to the Randolph family, as four of his children married four grandchildren of William Randolph I.

Biography
Benjamin Harrison IV was born in a small house on the plantation named "Berkeley Hundred" or "Berkeley Plantation". He completed his studies at The College of William & Mary and became the family's first college graduate. He settled on his family estate and increased his land holdings, as his ancestors had done. 

Around 1722, Harrison married Anne Carter, whom William Byrd II described as "a very agreeable girl", and he managed and received profits from her father's land as part of her dowry. Carter entailed this land to Harrison's son Carter Henry Harrison. Harrison built a Georgian-style three-story brick mansion on a hill overlooking the James River in 1726 using bricks that were fired on the plantation. Berkeley has a distinction shared only with Peacefield in Quincy, Massachusetts, as the ancestral home of two presidents. In 1729, Harrison purchased 200 acres of the Bradford plantation from Richard Bradford III. From 1736 to 1742, he represented Charles City County, Virginia in the House of Burgesses.

Harrison and his wife had 11 children:
Elizabeth (born ~1723) married Peyton Randolph, the son of Sir John Randolph, the grandson of William Randolph I, and the first President of the Continental Congress.
Anne (born ~1724) married William Randolph III, the son of William Randolph II and the grandson of William Randolph I, and had eight surviving children. Her descendants include Captain Kidder Breese.
Benjamin (born ~1726) married Elizabeth Bassett. His third son was President William Henry Harrison. His descendants include Congressman John Scott Harrison and President Benjamin Harrison.
Lucy (born ~ca.1792–1793) married Edward Randolph Jr., the son of Edward Randolph Sr. and the grandson of William Randolph I.
Hannah (born ~ – ~1745)
Carter (born ~1732) married Susannah Randolph, the daughter of Isham Randolph, and they had six children. His descendants include Chicago Mayors Carter Henry Harrison III and his son Carter Henry Harrison IV.
Henry (~1734 – ~1736) who died in infancy.
Henry (born ~1736–1772) who served as a captain under Major General Edward Braddock in the French and Indian War and under Lieutenant Colonel George Washington. Lived at Hunting Quarter in Sussex County.
Robert (born ~1738)
Charles (b. ~1740 – d. 1793) who was colonel of the 1st Continental Artillery Regiment.
Nathaniel (b. ~1741–d. 1792) who became Sheriff of Prince George County in 1779 and a member of the Virginia House of Delegates in 1781–1782. In 1760, he married Mary Ruffin, daughter of Edmund Ruffin and they had four children. He married Anne Gilliam in 1768 and they had six children. His descendants include J. Hartwell Harrison.

Harrison in 1745 was struck by lightning and killed, with one daughter, Hannah. Some reports incorrectly say his "two youngest daughters" were killed in 1745 when lightning struck his house. Harrison's will expressed his intent to be buried near his son Henry, and it broke with the British tradition of primogeniture by leaving large amounts of wealth to all of his children. His oldest son Benjamin became responsible for the six plantations that comprised Berkeley, along with the manor house, equipment, stock, and slaves. Eight other plantations were divided among the remaining sons, and his daughters were given cash and slaves.

One source indicates that Harrison's tomb is located on the grounds of the "old Westover Church", but another states that he was buried in his family's cemetery.

Notes

References

1693 births
1745 deaths
American planters
College of William & Mary alumni
Deaths from lightning strikes
Benjamin, IV
American slave owners
House of Burgesses members
People from Virginia